Tres destinos (Three Destinations) is an American telenovela produced by Telemundo recorded in Puerto Rico, Mexico and Los Angeles by Telemundo for the U.S. Hispanic market in 1993. It was led by Alejandra Maldonado and Osvaldo Ríos with antagonistic action of Rodolfo de Anda.

Cast 
 Alejandra Maldonado as Gabriela
 Osvaldo Ríos as Juan Carlos
 Rodolfo de Anda as Ramiro Garcés
 Edgardo Gazcón as Daniel Corona
 Lumi Cavazos as Cristina
 Caridad Ravelo as Marcela
 Irma Infante as Regina
 Lucy Boscana as Madre Asunción
 Mercedes Sicardo as Antonia
 Angela Meyer as Rita
 Angélica Soler as Brigitte
 Pedro Juan Figueroa as Lic. Rivera
 Samuel Molina as Tomás
 Rebeca Silva as Raquel
 Lino Ferrer as Aldemaro de la Rosa

References

External links 
 

Telemundo telenovelas
1993 telenovelas